Comedy Central Roast is a series of celebrity roast specials that air on the American television channel Comedy Central. The first official Comedy Central Roast premiered on August 10, 2003. On average one or two roasts air every year. There are eight to ten people invited who roast each other before finally roasting the title subject of each show. As of 2019, seventeen roasts have aired. Targets of roasts have included musicians, actors and comedians. Since 2010, Comedy Central affiliates outside the United States have occasionally produced their own roasts; twelve such roasts have aired so far, in five countries.

History
Between 1998 and 2002, the American television channel Comedy Central produced and televised the annual roasts of the New York Friars Club, which have been conducted since 1950.

1998 – Drew Carey, roastmaster Ryan Stiles
1999 – Jerry Stiller, roastmaster Jason Alexander
2000 – Rob Reiner, roastmaster Michael McKean
2001 – Hugh Hefner, roastmaster Jimmy Kimmel
2002 – Chevy Chase, roastmaster Paul Shaffer
After the original five-year agreement expired, the network began producing its own roasts in the same spirit. The first, featuring roastee Denis Leary (and produced by Leary's production company, Apostle), aired on August 10, 2003, and was the most watched program in the channel's history, excluding episodes of South Park.

Some roastees have stated that certain topics are off limits. Pamela Anderson, for example, prohibited jokes about her Hepatitis C infection. Joan Rivers disallowed jokes about her daughter Melissa, William Shatner asked that the death of his wife not be mentioned, and Donald Trump prohibited jokes about him not being as wealthy as he claims he is. Others, like David Hasselhoff, have imposed no limits on the topics. Although Charlie Sheen initially agreed to no restrictions on his roast, he later said during an interview with Jay Leno that he requested jokes about his mother be edited out of the broadcast.

During Sheen's roast, Steve-O made the joke "The last time this many nobodies were at a roast, at least Great White was playing". This was a reference to The Station nightclub fire in West Warwick, Rhode Island that killed 100 people on February 20, 2003. It was removed from broadcast on Steve-O's request.

During Denis Leary's roast, Lenny Clarke, a friend of Leary's, said there was a carton of cigarettes backstage from Bill Hicks with the message, "Wish I had gotten these to you sooner." This joke was cut from the final broadcast. During Roseanne Barr's roast, Jeff Ross compared fellow roaster Seth Green to James Holmes, the mass murderer responsible for the 2012 Aurora, Colorado shooting. The joke was not in the broadcast program.

Roasts

Recurring roasters
The table below features any roasters who have appeared on multiple Comedy Central Roasts. As of the Alec Baldwin roast, the most frequent roaster has been Jeff Ross, who has appeared in all but the first two roasts, for a total of 15, and has yet to be a roastmaster. Greg Giraldo has the second-most appearances, with a total of eight roasts from 2005 until his death in 2010 (nine including the 2002 New York Friars Club roast of Chevy Chase). , Seth MacFarlane has served as roastmaster three times, making him the most used roastmaster.

  Scheduled performer
  Performer who made a surprise appearance
RM  Indicates a roastmaster
O  Indicates performer's own roast

Venues
The following table features the venues where multiple Comedy Central Roasts were filmed. As of the Alec Baldwin roast, the Sony Pictures Studios in Culver City, California has hosted the most roasts, namely the roasts of Pamela Anderson, David Hasselhoff, Charlie Sheen, Justin Bieber, and Rob Lowe.

Cancelled roasts
In 2008, a roast for the musician Willie Nelson was planned to coincide with the release of his box set, One Hell of a Ride, but was ultimately cancelled, according to Jeff Ross.

A roast for the musician Kid Rock was announced in November 2010 and scheduled for January 2011, but was later replaced by the Donald Trump roast.  Rock's roast was rescheduled for August 2011, but was replaced again, this time by Charlie Sheen's roast. Kid Rock agreed to doing the roast if it were filmed in his hometown of Detroit, Michigan, a condition that Comedy Central refused.

International
The following roasts aired on international Comedy Central channels:

Comedy Central New Zealand:
 Comedian Mike King, on December 15, 2010. Willy de Wit was the roastmaster.
 Rugby player Murray Mexted, on September 7, 2011.

Comedy Central Africa:
 Singer Steve Hofmeyr, on September 24, 2012. Trevor Noah was the roastmaster.
 Businessman Kenny Kunene, on April 28, 2014. Jimmy Carr was the roastmaster. 
 Actor Somizi Mhlongo, on May 7, 2018. Gareth Cliff was the roastmaster.
 Rapper AKA, on February 21, 2019. Pearl Thusi was the roastmaster.
 Entertainer Khanyi Mbau, on August 8, 2022. Mpho Popps was the roastmaster. 

Comedy Central Latin America:
 Actor Héctor Suárez, on May 18, 2013. Héctor Suárez Gomís was the roastmaster.

Comedy Central Spain:
 Filmmaker Santiago Segura, on May 14, 2014. Alex O'Dogherty was the roastmaster.
 TV presenter El Gran Wyoming, on July 12, 2015. Andreu Buenafuente was the roastmaster.
 Comedian José Mota, on February 24, 2019. Anabel Alonso was the roastmaster.

Comedy Central Netherlands:
 Singer Gordon, on December 20, 2016. Jörgen Raymann was the roastmaster.
 Radio DJ Giel Beelen, on December 13, 2017. Gijs Staverman was the roastmaster.
 Actor Johnny de Mol, on December 18, 2018. Jeroom Snelders was the roastmaster.
 Rapper Ali B, on December 17, 2019. Sanne Wallis de Vries was the roastmaster.
 Magician Hans Klok, on December 21, 2021. Henry van Loon was the roastmaster.
 Singer Famke Louise, on January 16, 2023. Dolf Jansen was the roastmaster.

Awards and nominations

See also
 The Dean Martin Celebrity Roast
 A Comedy Roast
Historical Roasts, a spin-off series on Netflix
Roast Battle

Notes

References

External links
 

 
 
 
 
 
 
 
 
 
 
 
 
 
 
 
 
 

2000s American comedy television series
2003 American television series debuts
2010s American comedy television series
American annual television specials
Comedy Central Roasts
Comedy Central original programming
English-language television shows
Roast (comedy)